The 2013–14 Liga Națională was the 56th season of Romanian Handball League, the top-level men's professional handball league. The league comprises twelve teams. HCM Constanța were the defending champions, for the sixth time in a row.

Teams

Personnel

League table

Play-Off

League table – positions 1–3

League table – positions 4–6

Play-Out

League table – positions 7–9

League table – positions 10–12

Top goalscorers

Liga Națională (men's handball)
2013 in Romanian sport
2014 in Romanian sport
2013–14 domestic handball leagues